Night of Thunder is a 2008 thriller novel, and the fifth in the Bob Lee Swagger series by Stephen Hunter.

Plot
When his daughter Nikki, an investigative reporter, is seriously injured after her car is forced off a mountain road in Tennessee, Bob Lee Swagger hunts down those responsible for the accident. He unravels a criminal organisation disguised as a Baptist prayer camp and, with the help of Nick Memphis, his old pal from the FBI, thwarts their elaborately planned attempt to steal a cash truck right after a NASCAR race at the Bristol Motor Speedway.

References 

2008 American novels
American thriller novels
Novels by Stephen Hunter
Sequel novels
Simon & Schuster books